Butterscotch were an English soft rock band which consisted of Chris Arnold, David Martin and Geoff Morrow, who are also known collectively as the songwriting and record production trio Arnold, Martin and Morrow. They are best known for their top 20 UK and Ireland hit, "Don't You Know (She Said Hello)".

Career
As Butterscotch, they scored their first and only hit with "Don't You Know (She Said Hello)" in June 1970, which reached No. 17 on the UK Singles Chart (remaining on the chart for a total of 11 weeks), and No. 18 on the Irish Singles Chart. Their 1972 song "Can't You Hear the Song?" became a hit for Wayne Newton, reaching No. 3 on the U.S. Adult Contemporary chart, No. 48 on the Billboard Hot 100, No. 8 on the Canadian RPM adult contemporary chart and No. 32 on the RPM Top 100. Their song "Can't Smile Without You", originally recorded and released by band member David Martin in 1975, became a big hit for Barry Manilow in 1978. A version by the Carpenters was also released in 1976.

As Arnold, Martin and Morrow, they wrote and produced for many notable artists such as Elvis Presley ("A Little Bit of Green", "Let's Be Friends", "Sweet Angeline", "This Is the Story"), Cliff Richard, Wayne Newton, Dusty Springfield, Cilla Black, Mama Cass, Sandie Shaw, the Carpenters, Gerry and the Pacemakers, Edison Lighthouse, Johnny Mathis, Barry Manilow, Edwin Starr and Jessie J among many others, and also released their own material under this name.

Notable hit songs include the following:
"In Thoughts of You" - Billy Fury (1965)
"It's Up to You Petula" - Edison Lighthouse (1971)
"Annabella" - Hamilton, Joe Frank & Reynolds (1971) - U.S. #46, U.S. AC #21
"Can't You Hear the Song?" - Wayne Newton (1972)
"There's a Whole Lot of Loving" - Guys 'n' Dolls (1975)
"Here I Go Again" - Guys 'n' Dolls / Larry Evoy (1975 / 1977)
"Can't Smile Without You" - Barry Manilow / the Carpenters (1978 / 1976)
"Leave Before You Love Me" - Marshmello and Jonas Brothers (2021)

In the June 13, 1970 issue of Billboard magazine, the band were featured in the General News section under the headline "Butterscotch Tour of U.S. for RCA Disk".

Discography

Albums
Don't You Know Butterscotch? (1970), RCA Victor

Singles
Butterscotch
"Surprise, Surprise" (1970), RCA Victor
"Don't You Know (She Said Hello)" (1970), RCA Victor - UK No. 17, IRE No. 18
"All on a Summer's Day" (1971), Bell
"Some Day Soon" (1971), RCA Victor
"Office Girl" (1971), RCA
"Can't You Hear the Song" (1972), Jam
"Don't Make Me Laugh" (1973), Ammo
"Sunday Won't Be Sunday Anymore" (1974), Ammo

Arnold, Martin and Morrow
"Who in the World" (1971), Bell/RCA Victor
"I Believe in You" / "Sweet Angeline" (1971), Bell
"Windows" (1972), Bell
"Tomorrow's Song" (1974), DJM
"Take Me as You Find Me" (1975), DJM

References

External links

Arnold, Martin and Morrow discography at Discogs

British soft rock music groups
British musical trios
Musical groups established in 1969
RCA Victor artists
Bell Records artists
DJM Records artists